Rob Enderle (born July 27, 1954 in Corona, California) is an American technology analyst.

Enderle has worked at several technology companies including EMS Development Company, ROLM Systems and IBM, before becoming a technology analyst. He began his analyst career at Dataquest, before helping to launch GiGa Information Group. After GiGa was acquired by Forrester Research, he worked at Forrester  until leaving to found his own firm, the Enderle Group.

Enderle writes a number of columns for technological publications and regularly appears on radio and television. He sits on several advisory councils, including those for Lenovo, AMD and HP.  He shares a technology blog at Technology Pundits.  He has worked as an advisor for Microsoft, Dell, IBM, Siemens, and Intel, among other companies.

Comments
Enderle also comments in the media on a variety of technology companies, including Apple, HP, Google, Sony, Microsoft and Oracle, and on technology-related topics, such as security and consumer technology.

Education
 California State University, Long Beach, B.S. in Manpower Management, MBA

References

External links

 The Enderle Group

1954 births
Living people
American financial analysts
People from Corona, California
California State University, Long Beach alumni